
The Mhar Monastery (full name Saviour-Transfiguration Mhar Monastery) is a male monastery of the Ukrainian Orthodox Church (Moscow Patriarchate) on the bank of the Sula River near Lubny (Poltava Oblast, Ukraine).

It was founded in 1619 by Isaia Kopynsky (who later became the Metropolitan of Kiev of the reinstated Ruthenian Orthodox Church) on the money of Princess Regina Wiśniowiecka (cousin of Metropolitan Petro Mohyla) as a bratstvo designed to become a bulwark of Orthodoxy in the eastern part of the Polish–Lithuanian Commonwealth.

The Ukrainian Baroque katholikon was erected in the 1680s with the help of a generous grant from Hetmans Ivan Samoylovych and Ivan Mazepa. The seven-domed church with six piers was designed by a German architect who had worked on the Trinity Cathedral in Chernihiv. The number of domes was reduced to five after the central cupola had collapsed in 1728. A free-standing Neoclassical bell tower was started in 1785 but was not completed until 60 years later.

The monastery grounds contain the graves of several Kievan metropolitans. It was there that Yurii Khmelnytsky took the tonsure and St. Athanasius III of Constantinople (an ecumenical patriarch) died and was buried.

After 1925 the monastery was occupied by the leaders of the Lubny Schism, then housed a succession of institutions for children, including a Young Pioneer camp, until the monks were allowed to return there in 1993.

References

External links
 Mhar Monastery at Encyclopedia of History of Ukraine

Buildings and structures in Poltava Oblast
Monasteries of the Ukrainian Orthodox Church (Moscow Patriarchate)
1619 establishments in the Polish–Lithuanian Commonwealth
1619 establishments in Ukraine
Neoclassical church buildings in Ukraine